The San Diego Film Critics Society Award for Best Animated Feature is an annual film award given by the San Diego Film Critics Society.

Winners

2000s

2010s

2020s

References
San Diego Film Critics Society  - Awards

Awards for best animated feature film